Ulf Thomas Söderberg (born 19 December 1948) was Bishop of Västerås, Sweden, from 2008 to 2015.

Biography
Söderberg grew up in Grängesberg. He has been strongly involved in the renewal of the Swedish Church. For several years he worked as a vicar in Svärdsjö parish in Dalarna. He was director of St Luke's Foundation and later became vicar of Enviken. He was elected Bishop of Västerås on February 7, 2008 and was consecrated on May 4, 2008 in Uppsala Cathedral. He was nominated for Archbishop of Uppsala in 2006 and came in third place. after Anders Wejryd and Ragnar Persenius. Söderberg retired September 5, 2015.

References

Bishops of Västerås
1948 births
Living people
People from Västerås